Hephzibah or  Hepzibah ( or) is a figure in the Apocalypse of Zerubbabel, who is also mentioned in the Zohar. She was the wife of Nathan (son of David), and the mother of Menahem ben Ammiel, a putative messiah.

According to the Apocalypse of Zerubbabel, Hephzibah was a female warrior who slayed multiple evil kings. Her military exploits occurred in connection with the Jewish Revolt Against Heraclius and the Sassanian Conquest of Jerusalem.

References

Apocalyptic literature